Libero Grassi (19 July 1924 – 29 August 1991) was an Italian clothing manufacturer from Palermo, Sicily, who was killed by the Mafia after taking a solitary stand against their extortion demands. The businessman wrote an open letter to the local newspaper informing the extortionists that he was no longer willing to pay pizzo, a  Sicilian term for protection money. Other business-owners and shopkeepers in Palermo refused to join his public campaign. Grassi was gunned down in the street near his home eight months after writing the letter.

Grassi was born in Catania, was married, and had a son and daughter. Following his death, his family have continued his campaign, lending their support to the Addiopizzo movement that is against pizzo.

Pizzo demands
Grassi ran the Sigma factory producing men's underwear and pyjamas in Palermo. The company had around 100 employees and a business volume of US$5 million in 1990. Like many businessmen in the city, he was soon subjected to demands to pay "pizzo" or face the consequences. The pizzo – a form of protection racket – is demanded by the Mafia to local businesses and the refusal to pay can mean vandalism or arson attacks on places of business, or even physical harm, including murder, if demands are not met.

Refusal to pay pizzo
In late 1990, Grassi began to refuse to pay, as did an estimated 50% of Palermo businesses. The extortionists demanded money "for their poor friends in jail" and threatened to kill him. On 10 January 1991, Grassi wrote an open letter in the Giornale di Sicilia, a Palermo daily, that began "Dear extortionist," in which he denounced the Mafia's demands for protection money and publicly announced his refusal to pay. The same day, he reported the names of his extortionists to the police, a move that resulted in five arrests in March. 

The morning after the letter was published, the Mayor of Palermo, the prosecutor, the colonel of the federal police, and the press showed up at his factory to show support. However, even after he got police protection, two strangers appeared who claimed to be health inspectors and threatened the workers once they were inside. Grassi became something of a national hero in Italy, a Sicilian businessman who stood up to the Mafia, after appearing on nationwide TV on 11 April 1991 (at Michele Santoro's Samarcanda on Rai Tre). 

However, instead of receiving solidarity from other shopkeepers and businesses for his refusal to pay protection money, he was criticised, gradually isolated, and accused of demolishing the image of the Palermo business world. In his interviews, he denounced the Mafia and also the way that many of his fellow businessmen seemed to shun him, and how even customers ceased to frequent his store in fear of being caught in the wrath of the Mafia whom Grassi was provoking with his stance. Grassi stated in an interview:

Retaliations and murder
Grassi eventually had his shop broken into in early 1991 and the exact amount of money that had been demanded of him was stolen. An unsuccessful arson attack on his shop soon followed. The 67-year-old Grassi was gunned down in the via Vittorio Alfieri in Palermo at 7:30 in the morning on 29 August 1991, less than a year after taking his stance against the Mafia.  He was shot in the head three times as he walked from his home to his car. No witnesses came forward. After the killing, 10,000 people took to the streets to protest his murder. On 26 September 1991, TV hosts Santoro and Maurizio Costanzo dedicated a joint five-hour nationwide television programme to the memory of Grassi in a unique cooperation between the public Rai Tre and the private Canale 5, with the participation of anti-Mafia judge Giovanni Falcone.

Grassi's wife, Pina, and their children, Davide and Alice, tried to keep the family firm going. "I was terrified for their safety so, as the threats continued after Libero's killing, we reluctantly agreed to allow a state holding to run the company with Davide keeping a share," Pina recalled. It eventually went bankrupt.

Killers convicted
It took some time, but killer Mafioso Salvatore "Salvino" Madonia and his father Francesco Madonia, the unquestioned patriarch of the Resuttana Mafia family in Palermo, were eventually brought to justice. According to a Mafia turncoat, Salvatore Madonia personally killed Grassi. A large trial in October 2006 saw thirty mobsters convicted of sixty murders dating back a quarter-of-a-century, with the Madonias convicted of Grassi's slaying. 

One hundred shopkeepers in Palermo publicly declared their refusal to pay extortion to the Mafia in 2006, not long after Mafia boss Bernardo Provenzano was arrested, with Grassi's widow Pina and children Davide and Alice in attendance at public rallies denouncing the Mafia jointly with the Addiopizzo movement.

His wife and children put up a placard on the spot where he was killed in the via Vittorio Alfieri which says: 

Every year on 29 August, people gather at the site to commemorate the act of Grassi and protest against extortion.

See also
List of victims of the Sicilian Mafia

References

Jamieson, Alison (2000). The Antimafia: Italy’s fight against organized crime, London: Macmillan Press .
Stille, Alexander (1995). Excellent Cadavers. The Mafia and the Death of the First Italian Republic, New York: Vintage

External links
Remembering Libero Grassi at Best of Sicily
 letter of Libero Grassi, published in the Corriere della Sera, the day after he was killed.

1924 births
1991 deaths
1991 murders in Europe
Antimafia
Businesspeople from Palermo
Male murder victims
People murdered by the Sicilian Mafia
 deaths by firearm in Italy